Priacodon is an extinct genus of Late Jurassic eutriconodont mammal from the Alcobaça Formation of Portugal and the Morrison Formation of the midwestern United States.
It is present in stratigraphic zones 4–6 of the latter. The genus contains four known species: Priacodon ferox, Priacodon fruitaensis, Priacodon lulli and Priacodon robustus.

Jaw and teeth
A study on the jaw and teeth of Priacodon suggests that eutriconodonts, while specialised towards carnivory, had a more passive jaw roll than modern therian carnivores. It also demonstrates that embrasure occlusion was present in all eutriconodonts, as opposed to one-to-one patterns as previously assumed for the family Triconodontidae.

See also 
 Paleobiota of the Morrison Formation

References

Bibliography 
 Foster, J. (2007). Jurassic West: The Dinosaurs of the Morrison Formation and Their World. Indiana University Press. 389pp.

Triconodontidae
Tithonian life
Jurassic mammals of Europe
Jurassic Portugal
Fossils of Portugal
Jurassic mammals of North America
Morrison mammals
Fossil taxa described in 1887
Taxa named by Othniel Charles Marsh
Prehistoric mammal genera